Durward may refer to:

People
Alan Durward (died after 1264 or in 1275), effective ruler of Scotland at several times during the minority of Alexander III
Durward Gorham Hall (1910–2001), American politician
Durward Kirby (1912–2000), American television host and announcer
Durward Knowles (born 1917), Olympic champion sailor from the Bahamas
Durward Lely (1852–1944), Scottish opera singer

Places
 Durward, Alberta, a locality in Municipal District of Willow Creek No. 26
 Durward's Glen, a historic property in Caledonia, Columbia County, Wisconsin
 Durward Street, London, England

Other uses
 Hostarius, alternately Doorward or Durward, an office in medieval Scotland

See also
 Quentin Durward (disambiguation)
 
 Durwood (disambiguation)